The Dămuc (in its upper course also: Lupul) is a right tributary of the river Bicaz in Romania. It discharges into the Bicaz in Bicaz-Chei.

Tributaries

The following rivers are tributaries to the river Dămuc:

Left: Arșița, Picior, Pârâul Frunții, Pârâul Strungii, Pârâul Sătrișului
Right: Pârâul Sec, Asău, Glodul, Bățul, Ivaneș

References 

Rivers of Romania
Rivers of Harghita County
Rivers of Neamț County